The Charlotte Hornets were an American football team in the short-lived professional World Football League. Despite their brief existence, the Hornets were North Carolina's first attempt at a major league football team, predating the Carolina Panthers by two decades. They were relocated to Charlotte, North Carolina, from New York City in the middle of the 1974 season.

History

Origins in Boston
The Charlotte Hornets franchise began in 1973 in Boston as the Boston Bulldogs, which was also the name of the relocated Pottsville Maroons, Boston's first professional football franchise.  The name was shortened in October to Bulls.  They were owned by Howard Baldwin, president and minority owner of the New England Whalers of the World Hockey Association. Unlike most other WFL owners, he didn't have to pay a franchise fee because of his close ties to WFL founder and Commissioner Gary Davidson. He hired Vito "Babe" Parilli, who had been a backup to New York Jets quarterback Joe Namath in Super Bowl III, as head coach.

Baldwin was unable to find more investors, or even a suitable place to play. Realizing that he had no hope of putting together a viable product in Boston, Baldwin opted to merge with the WFL's as-yet-unnamed New York franchise on January 26, 1974. That team was owned by Whalers and Boston Celtics majority owner Bob Schmertz and three of his New York-based limited business partners; Henry Fujawski, John Lander and Steven Cohen who together made up the core of the Stars ownership and like Baldwin hadn't had to pay a franchise fee. The two teams had already worked together very closely in the draft. The merged team took the name New York Stars.

New York Stars
Finding a home field for the fledgling team in New York also proved difficult, partly due to bad timing. Yankee Stadium was closed for renovations right after the Yankees finished the 1973 season in October; it would not reopen until 1976. Shea Stadium was fully booked as the Yankees shared the park with the Mets as well as the NFL's Jets and Giants. (Giants Stadium, future home of both New York football teams, wouldn't open its doors until 1976.) The Stars had only two other options in the city proper: Downing Stadium, a 22,000-seat facility built during the Depression as a WPA Project on Randall's Island near the East River, or Baker Field, the 32,000-seat wooden stadium that served as the home of Columbia University's teams. Unable to come to terms with Columbia, Downing Stadium was ultimately chosen. The legendary Bob Sheppard, longtime voice of the New York Yankees, handled public address duties for the Stars.

Parilli signed a number of former Super Bowl III Jets including wide receiver George Sauer, who was coming out of retirement after three years, and former All-Pro defensive men Gerry Philbin, as well as John Elliott.

The WFL needed New York in order to have a presence in the largest U.S. media market. The Stars sold between 5,500 and 8,000 season tickets. After losing 14-7 at Jacksonville in front of a league high crowd of 59,112 at the Gator Bowl, the Stars' first home game against the Birmingham Americans attracted 17,943 New Yorkers. After leading 29-3 at halftime, the Stars were toppled by the efforts of Americans quarterback George Mira, who threw for three touchdowns and ran for another as Birmingham pulled out a 32-29 comeback win. The Stars achieved their first win as kicker Moses Lajterman kicked the winning field goal for a 17-15 win at Philadelphia. The Stars and Bell performed in front of the largest-ever WFL crowd, with 64,179 on hand; it later came out that most of the tickets were sold at large discounts or were given away free, to make the league appear more successful than it was.

New York then went on a tear, winning five in a row. Among the victims were the Jacksonville Sharks, Southern California Sun, Portland Storm, and Houston Texans. Coincidentally, the team's winning streak was stopped by those same Texans a week later, with a surprise addition to the Houston roster: John Matuszak, who had been AWOL from the NFL's Houston Oilers just 48 hours earlier. The Stars had mixed results in the next few weeks, beating Portland again, but losing to Florida in the rain and The Hawaiians in the sun. To improve the roster, New York picked up several NFL players from the waiver wire, including cornerback John Dockery (who played with Parilli for the Jets) and Don Highsmith, a running back released by Oakland who turned out to be a great addition to the Stars running attack. The Stars performed better on the field and were a nice alternative to the more expensive, yet losing, Giants and Jets.

For all their on-field success, the Stars were dragged down by serious off-field financial problems. Like most WFL teams, they were badly under-capitalized. Their fiscal structure began to founder when Schmertz's construction company ran into trouble. He was also involved in a nasty divorce, as well as a legal dispute over his ownership of the Celtics.

The Stars' biggest problem was Downing Stadium. Located on an island in the East River and accessible primarily on foot, it was nearly inaccessible from most parts of the city, and it had not been well maintained in at least 20 years. (Indeed, it had hosted little football in that time, most notably a partial season of the old Continental Football League.) Schmertz pumped over $200,000 into renovations, but it wasn’t enough to bring it to anything even approaching professional standards. The field was mostly sand and dirt, and amenities for fans, players and the press were virtually nonexistent. The toilets in the locker room frequently overflowed. During the home opener, the Stars' radio announcers John Sterling and Matt Snell had to sit on orange crates because there were no chairs in the press box; their Birmingham counterparts had to stand. Lighting was provided by four-decade-old light towers from Ebbets Field that were not nearly strong enough to completely illuminate the field. The lights were so dim that WFL's national television broadcaster, TVS, pronounced them unfit for broadcast and refused to air any games from the stadium. 

It soon became obvious that Schmertz and Baldwin were in no position to finish the season. With the Stars over a million dollars in debt and a stadium that was inadequate even for temporary use, the WFL resigned itself to abandoning the nation's biggest market.

September 24, 1974 was their final game at New York, against the Detroit Wheels (the game was moved from Wednesday because of Yom Kippur). Coincidentally, that same day, the Wheels' 33 owners filed for bankruptcy, leading reporters to call the game the "Bankrupt Bowl." The Stars blew out the destitute Wheels, 37-7. (The game was originally scheduled to be carried nationally by TVS, but the network begged off as both teams were near extinction, to say nothing of the poor lighting at Downing.)

Charlotte Stars/Hornets
While they were packing up for the next night's game against the Chicago Fire, Parilli announced the team was moving to Charlotte for the rest of the season as the Charlotte Stars. Part-owner Bob Keating told reporters that Downing Stadium’s poor attendance and substandard playing conditions made it impossible for the team to go on in New York.

The league had found a buyer in Upton Bell, the son and heir of former NFL commissioner Bert Bell and himself a former executive with the New England Patriots, after Charlotte mayor John M. Belk helped engineer a deal that made the move feasible. Forced to find a new logo literally at the last minute, the equipment man simply stuck the Chicago Bears' "C" logo over the old New York logo. Despite everything, the Stars—renamed the Hornets a few days later—put out the Fire, 41-30. Shortly after they arrived in Charlotte, however, their uniforms were impounded due to an unpaid laundry bill from New York; the Hornets had to practice in shorts and T-shirts until Bell posted a bond for the equipment. The team's first home game at Charlotte (the city's first-ever "big league" franchise) was a rousing success, selling out all 25,133 tickets at American Legion Memorial Stadium, leaving some 5,000 out of luck. The visiting Memphis Southmen ruined their debut, winning 27-23. In four games at Charlotte, the Hornets sold over 80,000 tickets compared to just 75,000 in seven games at Downing Stadium.

Toward the end of the season, the Hornets struggled on the field, losing their last four games. Off the field, things were not much better, as Bell was still scrambling to get more financing; a public offering hadn't attracted any investors. After their penultimate game, a federal judge ordered the seizure of most of the team's equipment (again) to compensate creditors back in New York.

Despite their late-season slump, the Hornets finished second in the Eastern Division behind the Florida Blazers, earning them a playoff spot and a date against the Blazers in Orlando. Unfortunately, by November 16, six days before the game, Florida had only sold 1,000 advance tickets (the final attendance was reported as 9,712), leading to concerns that the Hornets' cut of the gate would not even begin to meet their travel expenses. The players would have been lucky to get $100 for the game, nowhere near enough to justify the trip. League executive committee chairman and Memphis Southmen owner John F. Bassett called Bell and told him that the game was off. Bell had little choice but to agree. The players hadn't been paid since the third week of October, and he still hadn't been able to attract enough financing to field a team for 1975. Additionally, he was still paying Schmertz for buying the team. The Philadelphia Bell, who finished one game behind the Hornets (and with a losing record) but had somewhat more robust finances, replaced the Hornets as the second Eastern qualifier.

The Hornets returned for the 1975 campaign. Meanwhile, the reconstituted Chicago Winds franchise looked to sign quarterback Joe Namath, offering him a multi-million dollar contract to jump leagues. (Part of the deal called for Namath's eventual ownership of a WFL franchise in New York, which apparently would have involved moving the Hornets back to the Big Apple, perhaps playing in the refurbished Yankee Stadium.) But when Namath said no, league television partner TVS tore up its contract. The Hornets, like the rest of the league, felt the loss of TV coverage and revenue very hard. Despite fielding a competitive team (winning four in a row at one point), the Hornets didn't come close to selling out any of their contests in '75, drawing 43,761 fans for their four home games, less than half of capacity. Finally, the WFL ceased operations in mid-season, and the Hornets finished with a 6-5 record.

Schedule and results

1974 regular season

Source:
† first game after announcing move to Charlotte
‡ first home game in Charlotte

1975 regular season

Source:

See also
 1974 World Football League season
 1975 World Football League season

References

External links
New York Stars on FunWhileItLasted.net
http://www.charlottehornetswfl.com/
http://wfl.charlottehornetswfl.com/team_pages_1974/09.php
 1974 New York Stars / Charlotte Hornets stats & results at ultimate70s.com

 
Defunct American football teams
American football teams in Boston
American football teams in New York City
Hornets
American football teams in North Carolina
Boston Bulls
New York Stars
Charlotte Stars